Joseph Delpesh O'Cearuill (born 9 February 1987) is a retired footballer who played as a defender. His previous clubs have included Barnet and St. Patrick's Athletic, and he has been capped by the Republic of Ireland.

Career
Born in Edmonton, London, O'Cearuill started his career at Leyton Orient, playing 27 youth team games in the 2004–05 season, before being released in August 2005.

He joined Watford as a youth player for the 2005–06 season, but was released in the summer of 2006. He was signed by Premier League team Arsenal in July on a professional contract, having impressed after playing in their reserve team towards the end of the season. He was an unused substitute for the Arsenal first team on 24 October 2006; a League Cup third round match against West Bromwich Albion.

He moved to Barnet in August 2007 and made a total of 18 senior appearances for them.

In January 2008 O'Cearuill joined St Patrick's Athletic. He made his competitive debut for St Patrick's on 7 March 2008, in a League of Ireland match against Sligo Rovers. O'Cearuill made a total of 3 UEFA Cup appearances with St. Pats. He left the club in January 2009.

He signed for Harlow Town on 17 September 2009, before signing for Boreham Wood on 27 October.
He signed for Conference National team Forest Green Rovers on 6 November.In September 2010, Joe signed for Bishop's Stortford.
In November 2011 he was playing for Tooting and Mitcham United.

In August 2012 he signed for Haringey Borough, before joining Isthmian League Premier Division side Enfield Town in January 2013.

International career
Although born in England he was called up the Republic of Ireland senior squad for the first time in May 2007 for an end of season tour to the United States, making his senior debut as a substitute against Ecuador on 22 May 2007 at Giants Stadium. O'Cearuill then started the subsequent tour game against Bolivia at the Gillette Stadium.

Club career statistics
This table is incomplete.

Notes
 Cup statistics relate to the FA Cup for English teams and for the FAI Cup for St Patrick's
 European stats listed under 2008 St Patrick's season relate to 2008–09 UEFA Cup
 The "Other" column constitutes appearances and goals in the Football League Trophy unless stated. For his time at St Patrick's it relates to the 2008 Setanta Sports Cup.

See also
 List of Republic of Ireland international footballers born outside the Republic of Ireland

References

External links

1987 births
Living people
Footballers from Edmonton, London
Republic of Ireland association footballers
Republic of Ireland under-21 international footballers
Republic of Ireland B international footballers
Republic of Ireland international footballers
Association football defenders
Leyton Orient F.C. players
Watford F.C. players
Arsenal F.C. players
Brighton & Hove Albion F.C. players
Barnet F.C. players
St Patrick's Athletic F.C. players
Harlow Town F.C. players
Boreham Wood F.C. players
Forest Green Rovers F.C. players
Bishop's Stortford F.C. players
Tooting & Mitcham United F.C. players
Haringey Borough F.C. players
Enfield Town F.C. players
Heybridge Swifts F.C. players
Dover Athletic F.C. players
Staines Town F.C. players
League of Ireland players
English Football League players